Teylingen is a municipality in the Western Netherlands, in the province of South Holland. It was created on 1 January 2006, through the amalgamation of Sassenheim, Voorhout and Warmond. It is named after Teylingen Castle, located in Voorhout. In 2019, it had a population of 37,061.

The municipality is bordered by Noordwijkerhout and Lisse to the north, Haarlemmermeer and Alkemade to the east, Leiderdorp and Leiden to the south, Oegstgeest and Katwijk to the west. It is located in an area called the "Dune and Bulb Region" (Duin- en Bollenstreek). The Kagerplassen are to the east of Sassenheim.

Population centres
Sassenheim - location of city hall
Teijlingen, with Slot Teylingen
Voorhout
Warmond

Topography

Public transportation

Notable people 
 Herman Boerhaave (1668 in Voorhout – 1738) a Dutch botanist, chemist, Christian humanist and physician
 Han Zuilhof (born 1965 in Sassenheim) the Chair of Organic Chemistry at Wageningen University
 Frank Ammerlaan (born 1979 in Sassenheim) a Dutch artist who lives and works in London

Sport 

 Piet van der Lans (born 1940 in Sassenheim) a retired Dutch track cyclist, competed at the 1960 Summer Olympics
 Bart Zoet (1942 in Sassenheim – 1992) a Dutch cyclist, team gold medallist at the 1964 Summer Olympics
 Stan van Belkum (born 1961 in Warmond) a former water polo player, competed at the 1980 and 1984 Summer Olympics
 Rob van Dijk (born 1969 in Voorhout) a Dutch retired football goalkeeper with 364 club caps 
 Edwin van der Sar (born 1970 in Voorhout) a Dutch retired football goalkeeper with 606 club caps 
 Martin Hersman (born 1974 in Sassenheim) a retired speed skater, he competed at the 1994 and 1998 Winter Olympics

Image gallery

References

External links 

 

 
Municipalities of South Holland
Municipalities of the Netherlands established in 2006